Charles McCormack (29 April 1895 – 1975) was a Scottish footballer who played as a right back, mainly for Third Lanark and Hamilton Academical, as well as a short spell at Ayr United before retiring.

He made more than 350 appearances in the Scottish Football League's top division and the Scottish Cup across 14 seasons but won no major trophies, the closest he got being a defeat to Rangers in the Glasgow Cup final in 1923. He was involved in a memorable match while playing for Hamilton against Rangers in 1927: required to take over as goalkeeper when Alex Binnie suffered a broken leg, his team were awarded a penalty which he scored, and the opposition then missed a penalty of their own. Rangers eventually equalised but McCormack made several saves and Accies held out for a draw.

McCormack toured North America in the summer of 1921 with 'Scotland' (in reality, Third Lanark with a number of capable guest players); no other representative honours came his way.

References

1895 births
1975 deaths
Date of death missing
Footballers from Coatbridge
Association football defenders
Outfield association footballers who played in goal
Scottish footballers
Scottish people of Irish descent
Bellshill Athletic F.C. players
Third Lanark A.C. players
Hamilton Academical F.C. players
Ayr United F.C. players
Scottish Junior Football Association players
Scottish Football League players